Isoclerus is a genus of checkered beetles in the family Thanerocleridae.

Subgenera
Ababa Casey, 1897
Isoclerus Lewis, 1892
Lyctosoma Lewis, 1892
Parathaneroclerus Pic, 1936

References

Thanerocleridae